Matthew Wright (born 16 October 2002) is a Scottish professional footballer who plays as a forward for Falkirk, on loan from Ross County. He made his debut for County in the Scottish League Cup against Stirling Albion. He has also played on loan for Brora Rangers and Montrose.

Career

Ross County
Wright signed a two-year deal with Ross County on 30 May 2018 having played youth football with Point F.C. in the Western Isles. On 6 December 2020 Wright came off the bench against Rangers for his Scottish Premiership Debut. On return to Ross County in January 2022, Wright scored a 96th minute equaliser against Rangers, which was his first Scottish Premiership goal.

Brora Rangers (loan) 
On 11 August 2021 after appearing for Ross County in the Scottish League Cup against Montrose Wright was sent on loan to Highland Football League side Brora Rangers until January 2022.

Falkirk (loan) 
On 26 January 2023, Wright joined Scottish League One club Falkirk on loan until the end of the season.

Career statistics

References

2002 births
Living people
Association football forwards
Scottish footballers
Ross County F.C. players
Scottish Professional Football League players
Brora Rangers F.C. players
Highland Football League players
People from Stornoway
Sportspeople from Scottish islands
Montrose F.C. players

Falkirk F.C. players